Arthur Richard Marple, commonly known as Richard Marple or simply Dick Marple (March 4, 1931 — December 13, 2019), was a Republican member of the New Hampshire House of Representatives from the town of Hooksett. He served six terms in that body prior to his death in December 2019. He was succeeded by Democrat Kathleen Martins in a January 2020 special election.

Marple repeatedly introduced legislation recognizing and seeking to enforce various pseudolaw arguments of the sovereign citizen movement.

In 2016, Marple was charged with driving with a suspended license, after being pulled over in 2015. In a long rant he delivered directly to the judge presiding over his case, Kristin Spath, Marple argued a number of sovereign citizen claims, stating that he was present "under threat, duress and coercion" as the judge and the court system had no jurisdiction.

Furthermore, Marple claimed that the state did not have the authority to require licenses to drive, describing vehicles as "consumer goods." Nevertheless, Marple demanded his license be returned to him, describing the judge's refusal to do so as criminal conversion. Marple also recommended the judge recuse herself from his case. Following additional outbursts from Marple, Spath walked out of the courtroom.

Marple was found guilty of the charge against him and ordered to pay a fine of $310.

References

External links

1931 deaths
2019 deaths
21st-century American politicians
Republican Party members of the New Hampshire House of Representatives
Sovereign citizen movement individuals
People from Hooksett, New Hampshire